The NFCA Catcher of the Year is an award given by Diamond Sports to the best college softball catcher from an NFCA member institution. A committee of elected head coaches selects the winner of the award.

Winners

References

Awards established in 1997
College softball trophies and awards in the United States